Boris Ponge (born June 3, 1985 in Alès) is a French professional football player. Currently, he plays in the Championnat National for FC Martigues.

He played on the professional level in Ligue 2 for Dijon FCO and Clermont Foot.

References

1985 births
Living people
French footballers
Ligue 2 players
Dijon FCO players
Clermont Foot players
AS Beauvais Oise players
FC Martigues players
Association football midfielders